Alondra Oubré is an American medical anthropologist. 
Born in San Francisco and raised in the Bay Area she currently resides in Southern California.  
Oubré earned her M.A. in anthropology and a Ph.D. in anthropology and medical anthropology from UC Berkeley. 
In 1992, she joined Shaman Pharmaceuticals as a staff scientist.
She is the author of Instinct and Revelation, and has written on  plant drug research, pharmacology, and human biodiversity.

References

External links
 Prominent African Americans: Past & Present (aawc.com)
 Newsmakers (accessexcellence.org)
 African American Achievers (africanamericans.com)

Living people
University of California, Berkeley alumni
American science writers
American anthropologists
Year of birth missing (living people)